This table displays the top-rated primetime television series of the 1978–79 season as measured by Nielsen Media Research.

References

1978 in American television
1979 in American television
1978-related lists
1979-related lists
Lists of American television series